Ameer Khan (born 18 December 1982 in Islamabad), is a former first-class cricketer who has represented Chittagong Division. He made 42 first-class appearances from 2000–01 to 2011–12.

Notes

1982 births
Living people
Pakistani cricketers
Chittagong Division cricketers
Sportspeople from Islamabad
21st-century Pakistani people